Norwegian Archaeological Review is a peer-reviewed academic journal of archaeology. It was established in 1968 and is published biannually by Routledge.

External links 
 

Archaeology journals
Biannual journals
English-language journals
Publications established in 1968
Taylor & Francis academic journals
European history journals